Abhimanyu Acharya (b. 24 September 1994) is an Indian short story writer and playwright from Gujarat, India. He received the 2020 Yuva Puraskar for his short story collection Padchhayao Vacche ("Between the Shadows").

Biography
Abhimanyu Acharya was born on 24 September 1994 in Surendranagar, Gujarat, India. In 2010, he moved to Ahmedabad where he completed his schooling from St. Xavier's High School, and graduated from St. Xavier's College. At present, he is pursuing his Ph.D. at the University of Western Ontario, Canada in Comparative literature.

Works
Acharya's first short story was published in the Gujarati magazine Navneet Samarpan in 2009. His short story collection, Padchhayao Vacche ("Between the Shadows"), was published by Rangdwar Publication in 2018.
His stories deal with themes of love and sexuality, and often combines traditional storytelling with formal experimentation and lyricism. In 2022, his short story "Chunni" appeared in The Greatest Gujarati Stories Ever Told, edited by Rita Kothari.

His play Roundabout was staged in Gujarat and Karnataka. He directed Madhu Rye's Tell Me The Name Of A Flower in 2018.

Awards
Acharya received the 2020 Yuva Puraskar for his short story collection Padchhayao Vacche for which, he also received Gujarat Sahitya Akademi's Best Book Prize (2020). He received the Sanhita Manch playwriting award for his Hindi play Bhes. He was twice longlisted for TOTO Funds the Arts Award for his English writing.

See also 
 List of Gujarati-language writers

References

External links
 Inertia, short story by Abhimanyu Acharya
 Boundaries, play by Abhimanyu Acharya

1994 births
Living people
21st-century Indian short story writers
Gujarati-language writers
Indian male dramatists and playwrights
Indian male short story writers
People from Surendranagar district
Recipients of the Sahitya Akademi Yuva Puraskar